Lexie Madden, (born February 18, 1991) is an American beauty pageant titleholder from Torrington, Wyoming, who was named Miss Wyoming 2012.

Biography
Madden is a 2009 graduate of Torrington High School, and attended the University of Wyoming.

Madden won the title of Miss Wyoming on June 23, 2012, when she received her crown from outgoing titleholder Catherine Brown. Her platform was “Raising Awareness of the Importance of Physical Activity in Youth”, and she said she hoped to help in the fight against obesity by promoting physical activity among young people during her year as Miss Wyoming. Her competition talent was an original piano composition.

At the 2013 Miss America Pageant on January 12, 2013, Madden was named third runner-up to Miss America Mallory Hagan.

On June 27, 2015, Madden married Chicago Bears safety Chris Prosinski.

References

External links

 

Miss America 2013 delegates
1991 births
Living people
People from Torrington, Wyoming
University of Wyoming alumni
American beauty pageant winners
Beauty pageant contestants from Wyoming